Ilie Balaci (13 September 1956 – 21 October 2018) was a Romanian football midfielder and manager.

He spent 12 of his 15 years as a professional with Universitatea Craiova, appearing in more than 300 official games with the club and winning seven major titles. Nicknamed Minunea blondă ("the Blonde Wonder"), Balaci is considered one of the greatest Romanian footballers of all time.

Club career
Ilie Balaci, nicknamed Minunea blondă ("the Blonde Wonder"), was a product of Universitatea Craiova's youth system, where he started to play football at age 9. He made his Divizia A debut on 12 August 1973, when Universitatea's coach Constantin Cernăianu used him as a starter in a 1–1 against Jiul Petroșani at the age of 16, and he managed to win the league title in his first season in which he contributed with 3 goals scored in 27 appearances. Balaci went on to play twelve seasons with Universitatea Craiova, being part of the "Craiova Maxima" generation, helping them win two consecutive league titles in 1980 and 1981, at the first he contributed with 29 appearances and 6 goals and at the second with 29 appearances and 12 goals. He also won the Cupa României four times, in the years 1977 in which he opened the score in the final which ended 2–1 against Steaua București, 1978, 1981 in which he scored the first two goals in the 6–0 final against Politehnica Timișoara and 1983. Ilie Balaci played 35 games and scored 7 goals for "U" Craiova in European competitions, being an integral part of the team that reached the 1982–83 UEFA Cup semi-finals, appearing in 7 matches in the campaign, scoring 3 goals against Shamrock Rovers, Fiorentina and one from a free kick in the second leg of the semi-final against Benfica, as the team got eliminated after 1–1 on aggregate on the away goal rule. In December 1982, he signed a pre-contract with Italian side AC Milan, but the transfer did not materialize because Romania's communist regime did not allow it. On 21 February 1984 in a FC Baia Mare – "U" Craiova Divizia A match, Baia Mare's defender Grigore Arezanov gave a hard tackle with both feet on Balaci's leg which caused him an injury from which he never completely recovered. 

In the middle of the 1984–85 season, Balaci transferred from Universitatea Craiova to Olt Scornicești and after one season and a half with 30 Divizia A appearances in which he scored 7 goals, he switched teams again going in the 1986–87 season at Dinamo București. He spent two seasons at Dinamo, under the leadership of Mircea Lucescu, appearing in 32 Divizia A games in which he scored one goal, also making 3 appearances in European competitions. However, Balaci did not win any major trophies whilst he was playing for Dinamo and he went as a player-coach for two years in the second league, after which he ended his playing career. During his whole career, Balaci played 347 Divizia A matches in which he scored 84 goals and he was the Romanian Footballer of the Year in 1981 and 1982.

International career
Ilie Balaci has a total of 65 games and 8 goals scored at international level for Romania making his debut on 23 March 1974 at the age of 17 under coach Valentin Stănescu in a friendly against France which ended with a 1–0 loss. He played three games at the Euro 1976 qualifiers and scored his first goal for the national team at age 20 in a friendly which ended with a 3–2 loss against Czechoslovakia. He played one game at the 1973–76 Balkan Cup, five games in which he scored one goal at the 1977–80 Balkan Cup, three games at the 1978 World Cup qualifiers, two at the Euro 1980 qualifiers and seven games with one goal scored at the 1982 World Cup qualifiers. He also became captain of the national team during the successful Euro 1984 qualifiers where he played six games, including a praised performance in Romania's 1–0 victory against World Cup holders, Italy in which he gave the assist to László Bölöni's goal, exposed his dribbling abilities and had a good performance against his direct opponent Claudio Gentile. However coach Mircea Lucescu could not select him in the squad for the final tournament due to the injury he got in a Divizia A match from Grigore Arezanov. He played one game at the 1986 World Cup qualifiers and made his last appearance for the national team on 10 September 1986 in a 4–0 victory against Austria at the Euro 1988 qualifiers.

For helping his country qualify at Euro 1984, Balaci was decorated by President of Romania Traian Băsescu on 25 March 2008 with the Ordinul "Meritul Sportiv" – (The Medal "The Sportive Merit") class III.

International goals
Scores and results list Romania's goal tally first, score column indicates score after each Balaci goal.

Managerial career
After retiring as a footballer, Balaci went on to coach lower league sides Pandurii Târgu Jiu and Drobeta-Turnu Severin. In 1991, he coached clubs in North Africa and the Arab world, he became one of the most successful managers there having won over 22 major trophies domestic and international.

He took charge of Tunisia's Club Africain and Moroccan club Olympique Casablanca in the early 1990s guiding them to their first African Champions League, the league title and the Tunis Cup. He then managed UAE, Qatari and Saudi Arabian clubs Al Shabab, Al Nassr, Al-Hilal, Al Ain and Al Sadd winning the championship and domestic cup with each side. At the beginning of the 1998–99 Divizia A season, Balaci was put in charge of FC U Craiova but after a 1–0 loss against Oțelul Galați in the 7th round, he lost his temper and threw a pair of football shoes in referees Aron Huzu's head for which he received a one year suspension, after which he decided to resign. In the second half of the 2000–01 Divizia A season, Balaci returned to FC U Craiova but his second spell lasted only a month. In June 2003, he was appointed manager of Al Ahli until January 2005, where he won the UAE President's Cup. He then went on to join Qatari side Al-Arabi in the 2005–06 season, before moving to the United Arab Emirates club Al Shabab for a second spell, but without success. In August 2007, Balaci was hired as general manager of Universitatea Craiova whom he also coached in two periods, and remained there for two seasons. On 22 July 2009, Balaci was named head coach of Kuwait club Kazma. He had an impressive start with the Kuwaiti side at the 2010 AFC Cup.

On 11 July 2011, he returned to Morocco signing for Raja Casablanca but was sacked following a financial dispute with the club in September after just two months. Raja appointed Bertrand Marchand as his replacement.

On 4 June 2013, Balaci signed a contract with newly promoted Saudi Premier League side Al-Nahda saving the club from relegation. In September 2013, he was sacked as coach due to a poor start to the season with only one point from the first four matches.

In April 2016, he took over the head coach position at Omdurman-based club Al-Hilal. Balaci was sacked in September 2016 after the team clinched the title with three games left to play.  Balaci thought that the club's owners did not want the title win associated with his name.

In July 2017, Balaci was unveiled as the new manager of Omani side Al-Suwaiq. Although the team was assured of top of the championship with 38 points from 15 games Balaci decided to terminate his contract in March 2018 with 12 games left on the season.

Managerial overview

Personal life
Balaci said that he was born on 8 September 1956 but his birth date was declared by his relatives to the People's Council only on 13 September 1956. He had two daughters; the older one Lorena was married to footballer Eugen Trică and is divorced since 2015, and the younger one, Liana Ungur is a professional tennis player and she is married to Adrian Ungur.

Death
Balaci died on 21 October 2018, aged 62, while at home in Craiova with his mother. The cause of death was myocardial infarction.

Honours

Player
Universitatea Craiova
Divizia A: 1973–74, 1979–80, 1980–81
Cupa României: 1976–77, 1977–78, 1980–81, 1982–83
Romania
Balkan Cup: 1977–80

Individual
Romanian Footballer of the Year: 1981, 1982

References

External links

 
 
 Ilie Balaci Interview at cafonline.com

1956 births
2018 deaths
People from Dolj County
Romanian footballers
Association football midfielders
Romania international footballers
Liga I players
Liga II players
CS Universitatea Craiova players
FC Olt Scornicești players
FC Dinamo București players
CS Pandurii Târgu Jiu players
FC Drobeta-Turnu Severin players
Romanian football managers
CS Pandurii Târgu Jiu managers
Club Africain football managers
Al Shabab Al Arabi Club managers
Al Nassr FC managers
Al Hilal SFC managers
FC U Craiova 1948 managers
Al Ain FC managers
Al Sadd SC managers
Al-Arabi SC (Qatar) managers
Kazma SC managers
Raja CA managers
Al-Nahda Club (Saudi Arabia) managers
Al-Hilal Club (Omdurman) managers
Saudi Professional League managers
UAE Pro League managers
Qatar Stars League managers
Kuwait Premier League managers
Oman Professional League managers
Romanian expatriate football managers
Romanian expatriate sportspeople in Kuwait
Expatriate football managers in Kuwait
Romanian expatriate sportspeople in Morocco
Expatriate football managers in Morocco
Romanian expatriate sportspeople in Oman
Expatriate football managers in Oman
Romanian expatriate sportspeople in Qatar
Expatriate football managers in Qatar
Romanian expatriate sportspeople in Saudi Arabia
Expatriate football managers in Saudi Arabia
Romanian expatriate sportspeople in Sudan
Expatriate football managers in Sudan
Romanian expatriate sportspeople in Tunisia
Expatriate football managers in Tunisia
Romanian expatriate sportspeople in the United Arab Emirates
Expatriate football managers in the United Arab Emirates
Botola managers